Alix Potet, who obtained her doctorate of sciences in 1990, is professor of informatics at the University of Rennes. Potet is Vice President of the Union Interlinguiste de France (UIF) as well as co-author of the French-language supplement to the manual Interlingua by Ingvar Stenström (1988) and of a French-Interlingua dictionary (1991). 

Potet became interested in Interlingua through her father, Jean Mahé (1916-2001), who was influential in the growth and popular use of Interlingua. In 1989, she was elected French member of the General Council of the Union Mundial pro Interlingua. Later that year, she became President of the Union Interlinguiste de France; her sister Madeleine was secretary. In 1995, Alix Potet joined the Council of the Bakonyi Foundation for Universal Language, which funds the publication of books in Interlingua.

In 2002, she left the Presidency of the UIF after 13 years, allowing Jeanne Martinet to assume that position. Potet became Vice President. She has taught Interlingua to beginners at several conferences since 1991. Her materials were later used for Interlingua courses presented in Cyprus.

External links

 Union Mundial pro Interlingua
 Union Interlinguiste de France

Interlingua speakers
Year of birth missing (living people)
Living people
University of Rennes alumni
Place of birth missing (living people)